Eucalyptus synandra, commonly known as Jingymia mallee, is a mallee that is native to Western Australia. It has smooth bark, dull green, linear to narrow lance-shaped leaves, flower buds in groups of seven, creamy white to pink flowers and hemispherical to saucer-shaped fruit.

Description
The bark is smooth, white to grey, sometimes powdery, and is shed in ribbons to reveal pink and brownish new bark. It has an open canopy that allows some light through. Flowering occurs between August and March and the flowers are creamy white to pink. The lower half of the stamens merge into a single tube.

Taxonomy
Eucalyptus synandra was first formally described by the botanist Michael Douglas Crisp in 1982 in the journal Nuytsia. The specific epithet (synandra) is from ancient Greek words meaning "together" and "male", referring to the joined stamens.

Distribution
Jingymia mallee is found as several small populations on sandplains and rises in an area between Geraldton and Mount Marshall in the Mid West, Wheatbelt regions where it grows in sandy and gravelly lateritic soils. The 27 separate populations of the species, containing about 1200 individual plants are scattered over a  length mostly between north of Morawa to around Koorda. They are mostly found on road verges but also on private land, conservation areas, pastoral leases and a timber reserve. It is usually found heath and scrub communities, associated with species including Eucalyptus leptopoda, E. erwartiana, E. loxophleba subsp. supralaevis, E. subangusta, E. brachycorys, Acacia coolgardiensis, A. acuaria and Hakea recurva.

Conservation status
This mallee is classified as "Threatened Flora (Declared Rare Flora — Extant)" by the Department of Environment and Conservation (Western Australia).

Use in horticulture
Although the tree is not commonly cultivated, it is commercially available in seed form or as seedlings. The drought tolerant plant grows in full sun and attracts birds such as honeyeaters to the garden.

See also
List of Eucalyptus species

References

Eucalypts of Western Australia
synandra
Myrtales of Australia
Mallees (habit)
Plants described in 1982
Taxa named by Michael Crisp